DXDD is the callsign of Dan-ag sa Dakbayan Broadcasting Network's two stations in Ozamiz: 

 DXDD-AM, branded as Radyo Kampana
 DXDD-FM, branded as Cool Radio